Mormon Helping Hands (or, more recently, simply Helping Hands) is a name under which members of the Church of Jesus Christ of Latter-day Saints (LDS Church) perform volunteer community service. The name and its logo are worn on t-shirts and vests worn by LDS Church members while providing the service. The shirts and vests are bright yellow or white.

The logos were used in 1992 in South Florida after Hurricane Andrew ravaged the city of Homestead and other parts of Miami-Dade County, Florida.  The Church officially established the program in 1998 in Argentina, Paraguay, Uruguay and Chile to identify service being done by members of the LDS Church.  That same year it was implemented on a large scale in Brazil as part of a country-wide day of service organized by the church.  It has since been used in many countries. 

Mormon Helping Hands operates under the direction of local stake and district presidents and bishops. The activities are meant to provide community service and are not proselytizing in nature.

Mormon Helping Hands both responds to disasters such as hurricanes and gives aid aimed at improving conditions caused by long-standing problems such as deterioration of parks that lack proper upkeep. The Helping Hand Mormons, as of 2017, were asked to, as the name applies, help out with the cleanup of Hurricane Harvey and were featured on the news.

See also
 LDS Humanitarian Services
 LDS Philanthropies

Notes

External links

Mormon Life stories on the Mormon Helping Hands

Christian organizations established in 1998
Organizational subdivisions of the Church of Jesus Christ of Latter-day Saints
Service organizations based in the United States
Religious service organizations